In photography, the 35 mm equivalent focal length is a measure that indicates the angle of view of a particular combination of a camera lens and film or sensor size.  The term is popular because in the early years of digital photography, most photographers experienced with interchangeable lenses were most familiar with the 35 mm film format.

On any 35 mm film camera, a 28 mm lens is a wide-angle lens, and a 200 mm lens is a long-focus lens. However, now that digital cameras have mostly replaced 35 mm cameras, there is no uniform relation between the focal length of a lens and the angle of view, since the size of the camera sensor also determines angle of view, and sensor size is not standardized as film size was. The 35 mm equivalent focal length of a particular lens–sensor combination is the focal length that one would need for a 35 mm film camera to obtain the same angle of view.

Most commonly, the 35 mm equivalent focal length is based on equal diagonal angle of view. This definition is also in the CIPA guideline DCG-001. Alternatively, it may sometimes be based on horizontal angle of view. Since 35 mm film is normally used for images with an aspect ratio (width-to-height ratio) of 3:2, while many digital cameras have a 4:3 aspect ratio, which have different diagonal-to-width ratios, these two definitions are often not equivalent.

Calculation
35 mm equivalent focal lengths are calculated by multiplying the actual focal length of the lens by the crop factor of the sensor. Typical crop factors are 1.26× – 1.29× for Canon (1.35× for Sigma "H") APS-H format, 1.5× for Nikon APS-C ("DX") format (also used by Sony, Pentax, Fuji, Samsung and others), 1.6× for Canon APS-C format, 2× for Micro Four Thirds format, 2.7× for 1-inch sensors (used in Nikon 1 cameras and some Sony RX cameras), 5× to 6× for compact digital cameras, and even higher for built-in cameras of mobile devices like cell phones or tablets.

According to CIPA guidelines, 35 mm equivalent focal length is to be calculated like this:
"Converted focal length into 35 mm camera" = (Diagonal distance of image area in the 35 mm camera (43.27 mm) / Diagonal distance of image area on the image sensor of the DSC) × focal length of the lens of the DSC.

Depth of field equivalent 
Quoted 35 mm equivalent focal lengths typically ignore depth of field (DOF), which depends on both focal length and aperture. The DOF of smaller sensors is deeper at a given f number, due to the smaller absolute aperture diameters corresponding to shorter focal length lenses.

Equivalent depth of field can be calculated the same way using the crop factor. For example, a 50mm f/2 lens on a 2× crop factor Micro Four Thirds camera would be equivalent to a 100 mm (= 2×50 mm) f/4 (= f/(2×2)) lens on a full-frame digital SLR in terms of field of view, depth of field, total light gathered, and diffraction effects.

Conversions
A standard 35 mm film image is 36 mm wide by 24 mm tall (35 mm refers to the height of the film including the perforations for film transport), and the diagonal is 43.3 mm. This leads to the following conversion formulas for a lens with a true focal length f:

For historical reasons, sensor size specifications such as 1/2.5" do not match the actual sensor size, but are a bit larger (typically about a factor of 1.5) than the actual sensor diagonal. This is because these sensor size specifications refer to the size of a camera tube, while the usable sensor size is about 2/3 of the size of the tube. Tubes are not used on digital cameras, but the same specifications are used.

Apart from the width- and diagonal-based 35 mm equivalent focal length definitions, there is a third definition: EFL = 50 f /d mm. However, it is not clear to what extent this definition is used.

References

External links
Focal Length Conversion for medium format and large format, at photo.net
Focal Length at dpreview

Science of photography